Gink Lik-e Qarah Sahneh (also Romanized as Gīnk Līk-e Qarah Saḥneh; also known as Gīnk Līk and Gīnklīk-e Forūdgāh) is a village in Tamran Rural District, in the Central District of Kalaleh County, Golestan Province, Iran. At the 2006 census, its population was 93, in 16 families.

References 

Populated places in Kalaleh County